Albania competed at the 2010 European Aquatics Championships in Budapest, Hungary between 4–15 August 2010.

Swimming

Albania sent with an invite one swimmer, Mario Sulkja. Another swimmer was allowed to participate in time trials, Besmir Buranaj Hoxha. Due to registration issues, Hoxha, was unable to fully compete in the championships.

See also 
 Albania at the 2008 Summer Olympics
 Albania at the 2005 Mediterranean Games
 Albania at the 2013 Mediterranean Games
 Albania at the 2011 World Aquatics Championships
 Albania at the 2012 Summer Olympics

References

External links
 2010 European Aquatics Championships 2010 European Aquatics Championships
 

Swimming in Albania
Nations at the 2010 European Aquatics Championships
Albania at the European Aquatics Championships